Pat O'Hara Wood defeated Bert St. John 6–1, 6–1, 6–3 in the final to win the men's singles tennis title at the 1923 Australian Championships.

Draw

Key
 Q = Qualifier
 WC = Wild card
 LL = Lucky loser
 r = Retired

Top half

Bottom half

See also
1923 Australasian Championships – Women's singles''

References
 

1923 in Australian tennis
Men's Singles